Coralstown, also Correllstown, is a village in County Westmeath, Ireland. It is located in the south of the county on the N4 road, to the north of Kinnegad.

The village contains a National school, a post office, and a church dedicated to St Agnes.

See also 

 List of towns and villages in Ireland

References 

Towns and villages in County Westmeath